The 2019 Leicester City Council election took place on 2 May 2019 to elect all fifty-four members of the Leicester City Council in England. This was on the same day as other local elections, and the election for the directly elected Mayor of Leicester.

Summary

Election result

|-

Ward Results

Abbey (3)

Aylestone (2)

Belgrave (3)

Beaumont Leys (3)

Braunstone Park & Rowley Fields (3)

Castle (3)

Evington (3)

Eyres Monsell (2)

Fosse (2)

Humberstone & Hamilton (3)

Knighton (3)

North Evington (3)

Rushey Mead (3)

Saffron (2)

Spinney Hills (2)

Stoneygate (3)

Thurncourt (2)

Troon (2)

Westcotes (2)

Western (3)

Wycliffe (2)

By-elections

North Evington, May 2021

Humberstone and Hamilton, July 2021

Evington, February 2022

North Evington, October 2022

Notes

References

2019 English local elections
May 2019 events in the United Kingdom
2019
2010s in Leicester